Mary Lawrance (also known as Mary Kearse) (fl. 1794–1830) was a British botanical illustrator who specialized in flowers. She also taught botanical illustration. She is best known for producing the earliest published work on roses.

Her first known exhibition was at the Royal Academy of Arts in 1795. Between 1796 and 1799 she created and published The Various Kinds of Roses Cultivated in England. The book featured paintings of roses that Lawrance drew from nature. She also engraved and hand coloured the plates of the book and undertook the printing and publishing of the volume.  In 1813 she married Thomas Kearse, continuing to work under her married name Mrs Kearse. She exhibited work until 1830. Her work is held in the collection of the New York Public Library, the Auckland Libraries Heritage Collection, and the Cleveland Museum of Art.

Works by Mary Lawrance

A Collection of Roses from Nature, 1799
Sketches of Flower from Nature, 1801
A Collection of Passion Flowers Coloured from Nature, 1802

References

Flower artists
19th-century English painters
Year of birth missing
Year of death missing